The 9th Directors Guild of America Awards, honoring the outstanding directorial achievements in film and television in 1956, were presented in 1957.

Winners and nominees

Film

Television

D.W. Griffith Award
 King Vidor

Honorary Life Member
 Donald Crisp

External links
 

Directors Guild of America Awards
1956 film awards
1956 television awards
Direct
Direct
1956 awards in the United States